The men's high jump event at the 2017 European Athletics U23 Championships was held in Bydgoszcz, Poland, at Zdzisław Krzyszkowiak Stadium on 13 and 15 July.

Medalists

Results

Qualification
13 July

Qualification rule: 2.18 (Q) or the 12 best results (q) qualified for the final.

Final

15 July

References

High jump
High jump at the European Athletics U23 Championships